The Temple of Ramesses III at Medinet Habu was an important New Kingdom period temple structure in the West Bank of Luxor in Egypt. Aside from its size and architectural and artistic importance, the mortuary temple is probably best known as the source of inscribed reliefs depicting the advent and defeat of the Sea Peoples during the reign of Ramesses III.

Modern identification and excavation

The first European to describe the temple in modern literature was Vivant Denon, who visited it in 1799–1801. Jean-François Champollion described it in detail in 1829.

Initial excavation of the temple took place sporadically between 1859 and 1899, under the auspices of the Department of Antiquities. During these decades the main temple was cleared, and a large number of the Greco-Roman period buildings, including a substantial Byzantine Church in the second court, were destroyed without notes or records being taken.

The further excavation, recording and conservation of the temple has been facilitated in chief part by the Architectural and Epigraphic Surveys of the University of Chicago Oriental Institute, almost continuously since 1924.

Description

Its walls are relatively well preserved and it is surrounded by a massive mudbrick enclosure, which may have been fortified. The original entrance is through a fortified gate-house, known as a migdol (a common architectural feature of Asiatic fortresses of the time).

Just inside the enclosure, to the south, are chapels of Amenirdis I, Shepenupet II and Nitiqret, all of whom had the title of Divine Adoratrice of Amun.

The first pylon leads into an open courtyard, lined with colossal statues of Ramesses III as Osiris on one side, and uncarved columns on the other. The second pylon leads into a peristyle hall, again featuring columns in the shape of Ramesses. The third pylon is reached by continuing up a ramp that leads through a columned portico and then opens into a large hypostyle hall (which has lost its roof). Reliefs and actual heads of foreign captives were also found placed within the temple, perhaps in an attempt to symbolise the king's control over Syria and Nubia.

In the Greco-Roman and Byzantine period, there was a church inside the temple structure, which has since been removed. Some of the carvings in the main wall of the temple have been altered by Christian carvings.

The royal palace was directly connected with the first courtyard of the temple via the "Window of Appearances".

Minor king list 
The Medinet Habu king list is a procession celebrating the festival of Min, with the names of nine pharaohs. It can be found on the upper register of the eastern wall in the second courtyard.

Gallery

See also
Mortuary Temple of Amenhotep III

References

Further reading
 William J. Murnane, United with Eternity – A Concise Guide to the Monuments of Medinet Habu, Oriental Institute, University of Chicago and the American University of Cairo Press, 1980.

Archaeological reports
 The Epigraphic Survey, Medinet Habu I, Earlier Historical Records of Ramses III (OIP 8; Chicago, 1930)
 The Epigraphic Survey, Medinet Habu II, Later Historical Records of Ramses III (OIP 9; Chicago, 1932)
 The Epigraphic Survey, Medinet Habu III, The Calendar, the 'Slaughter House,' and Minor Records of Ramses III (OIP 23; Chicago, 1934)
 The Epigraphic Survey, Medinet Habu IV, Festival Scenes of Ramses III (OIP 51; Chicago, 1940)
 The Epigraphic Survey, Medinet Habu V, The Temple Proper, part 1 (OIP 83; Chicago, 1957)
 The Epigraphic Survey, Medinet Habu VI, The Temple Proper, part 2 (OIP 84; Chicago, 1963)
 The Epigraphic Survey, Medinet Habu VII, The Temple Proper, part 3 (OIP 93; Chicago, 1964)
 The Epigraphic Survey, Medinet Habu VIII, The Eastern High Gate (OIP 94; Chicago, 1970)
 W. F. Edgerton, Medinet Habu Graffiti Facsimiles (OIP 36; Chicago, 1937)
 Uvo Hölscher, Medinet Habu 1924–1928. II The Architectural Survey of the Great Temple and Palace of Medinet Habu (season 1927–28). OIC, No. 5. Chicago: University of Chicago Press, 1929.
 H. J. Thissen, Die demotischen Graffiti von Medinet Habu: Zeugnisse zu Tempel und Kult im Ptolemäischen Ägypten (Demotische Studien 10; Sommerhausen, 1989)

External links

 The Epigraphic Survey – The Oriental Institute, University of Chicago
 
A Foreign Captive at Medinet Habu
 
Christianization of the ancient temples Byzantine Empire

Medinet Habu Picture Gallery 2006

Buildings and structures completed in the 12th century BC
Theban Necropolis
Colossal statues in Egypt
Ramesses III
Egyptian temples
12th-century BC establishments in Egypt